VU-0238429 is a drug which acts as a selective positive allosteric modulator for the muscarinic acetylcholine receptor M5. It was the first selective ligand developed for the M5 subtype, and is structurally derived from older M1-selective positive allosteric modulators such as VU-0119498. Replacing the O-methyl- by a phenyl group further improves the receptor subtype selectivity.

References 

Receptor modulators
Trifluoromethyl ethers
Indoles